1. FC Heidenheim 1846 is a German association football club from the city of Heidenheim, Baden-Württemberg.

History

The current day club was formed in 2007 through the separation of the football section from parent association Heidenheimer Sportbund, a larger sports club that has 5,800 members in 27 departments. The independence of the football side allows it to operate under the stricter economic standards set for professional clubs which are members of the German Football Association (Deutscher Fußball-Bund or German Football Association).

Heidenheimer SB itself was founded through the 1972 merger of TSB Heidenheim and VfL Heidenheim. The club's origins go back to 14 August 1846, with the establishment of the gymnastics club Turngemeinde Heidenheim, which folded in 1852, but was re-constituted under the same name in 1861. The club was renamed Turnverein Heidenheim in 1872.

A football department was created within the association on 8 July 1911 and became an independent side known as VfR 1911 Heidenheim on 21 August 1922. The swimming club Schwimmverein 04 Heidenheim joined VfR in 1936 to form VfL Heidenheim 04. In 1949, following World War II, these two clubs went their separate ways, the swimmers under their original name, and the footballers as VfL Heidenheim 1911.

In the meantime, parent club TV 1846 Heidenheim was joined on 13 July 1935 by SpVgg Heidenheim and then on 3 April 1937 merged with 1. Sportverein 1900 Heidenheim – which was known as Athletenklub Hellenstein until 1920 – to become TSV 1846 Heidenheim. After the war TSV was united with Turnerbund Heidenheim 1902 whose history was as a worker's club. TB was established on 21 December 1902 and was renamed Turnerbund Heidenheim on 6 August 1904. This club merged with Arbeiterturnverein 1904 Heidenheim on 8 March 1919. Like other worker's clubs, TB was considered as politically unreliable by the Nazi regime and was dissolved in 1933. It was re-established after the war and on 3 February 1946 joined TSV 1846 Heidenheim to form TSB 1846 Heidenheim.

27 May 1972 merger of TSB and VfL brought all these threads together, returning the footballers to the fold of the original gymnastics club. Heidenheimer SB and predecessor VfL Heidenheim played in the Amateurliga Württemberg (III) from 1963 to 1975 and again from 1976 to 1979. Regional cup wins led to the team's participation in the opening round of the DFB-Pokal (German Cup) in 1975, 1978, and 1980, before the side slipped into lower level competition.

The club has since recovered and in 2004 advanced to the Oberliga Baden-Württemberg. A successful season finish in 2008 saw the club being promoted to the Regionalliga Süd. Having simultaneously won the Württemberg Cup, Heidenheim was allowed to participate in the first round of the DFB-Pokal in the following season, where the team lost 0–3 to VfL Wolfsburg. In 2009, Heidenheim finished first in the Regionalliga Süd and got promoted to the 3. Liga.

After five seasons in the 3. Liga with the club always finishing in the upper half of the table, 1. FC Heidenheim won the league in 2013–14, and earned promotion to the 2. Bundesliga for the first time. At the same time the club however withdrew its reserve team, playing in the Oberliga Baden-Württemberg, from competition after such teams ceased to be compulsory for professional clubs.

In the 2019–20 season, 1. FC Heidenheim finished third to play against the 16th-placed Bundesliga club, Werder Bremen, in the promotion-relegation play-offs. The tie ended in a 2–2 draw on aggregate, as 1. FC Heidenheim lost on the away goals rule to stay in 2. Bundesliga.

Honours
The club's honours:

League
 3. Liga
 Champions: 2013–14
 Regionalliga Süd (IV)
 Champions: 2009
 Oberliga Baden-Württemberg
 Runners-up: 2006‡
 Verbandsliga Württemberg
 Champions: 2013#

Cup
 Württemberg Cup
 Winners: 1965†, 2008, 2011, 2012, 2013, 2014
 Runners-up: 1977‡, 2005‡

 ‡ Won by SB Heidenheim.
 † Won by VfL Heidenheim.
 # Won by reserve team.

Players

Current squad

Coaching staff

Recent managers
Recent managers of the club:

Recent seasons
The recent season-by-season performance of the club:

1. FC Heidenheim

1. FC Heidenheim II

 With the introduction of the Regionalligas in 1994 and the 3. Liga in 2008 as the new third tier, below the 2. Bundesliga, all leagues below dropped one tier.

Key

Stadium
Since June 1973 the team has played in the Albstadion which has a capacity of 8,000. Since the extension in 2009 the stadium is now called Voith-Arena and accommodates 10,000 visitors. Following another extension in 2013 the stadium holds 13,000 visitors. At the beginning of 2015 another extension was added increasing capacity to 15,000.

References

Sources
Grüne, Hardy (2001). Vereinslexikon. Kassel: AGON Sportverlag

External links
 
1. FC Heidenheim 1846 at Weltfussball.de 
Das deutsche Fußball-Archiv historical German domestic league tables 
eufo.de European football club profiles and current rosters 

 
Football clubs in Germany
Football clubs in Baden-Württemberg
Association football clubs established in 1846
1846 establishments in Germany
Heidenheim (district)
2. Bundesliga clubs
3. Liga clubs